The Oparin/Urey Medal honours important contributions to the field of origins of life. The medal is awarded by the International Society for the Study of the Origin of Life (ISSOL). The award was originally named for Alexander Ivanovich Oparin, one of the pioneers in researching the origins of life. In 1993, the Society decided to alternate the name of the award so as to also honour the memory of Harold C. Urey, one of the first to propose the study of cosmochemistry.

List of winners
The current list of medalists is shown below:

References

Origin of life